Bruunilla natalensis is a deep-sea scale worm that is known from a single specimen collected from the Mozambique Basin in the Indian Ocean from a depth of about 5000 m.

Description
Bruunilla natalensis is a short-bodied worm with up to about 18 segments and 8 pairs of elytra. It is grey without patterns and lacks lateral antennae.

References

Phyllodocida